Sa'id ibn Abd al-Malik ibn Marwan (died 750), also known as Saʿīd al-Khayr ('Sa'id the Good'), was an Umayyad prince and governor. 

He played a role in the construction of the Dome of the Rock in Jerusalem in the early part of his father Caliph Abd al-Malik's reign. He governed Mosul for an undetermined period under his father and was responsible for several building and infrastructural works there. Sa'id was later granted property in Mosul's vicinity by his brother, Caliph al-Walid I, or his cousin, Caliph Umar ibn Abd al-Aziz, which he developed into an agricultural tract with a canal. In 724 and 725, he led summer campaigns against the Byzantines in Anatolia. During the rule of his nephew, Caliph al-Walid II, between February 743 to April 744, Sa'id served as the governor of Palestine, but was expelled by rebels in the district after al-Walid II's death. Sa'id was killed in the massacre of the Umayyad family near Ramla after the Abbasid toppling of the dynasty in 750.

Origins
Sa'id was the son of the Umayyad caliph Abd al-Malik and one of his concubines. He became known as Sa'id al-Khayr, which translates as 'Sa'id the Good', because of his piety, pleasantness and charitable works. The 9th-century historian al-Tabari notes that he was "man of good character", while the historian al-Baladhuri claimed he practiced asceticism. Between 688 and 692, Sa'id was the supervisory representative of his father for the construction of the Dome of the Rock in Jerusalem.

Governor of Mosul
Others who served the post at some point during his father's reign were his uncle Muhammad ibn Marwan and cousin Yusuf, the son of Yahya ibn al-Hakam. Sa'id was responsible for a number of building works in the city during his rule. The 8th-century historian al-Waqidi attributes to him the construction of city walls, but these were later tore down by the Abbasid caliph Harun al-Rashid in 796. Sa'id is further credited in medieval Muslim sources for constructing a mosque, a monastery, a market, and the pavement of Mosul's streets.

He had a canal dug through the property, which was later named Nahr Sa'id after him. Through his irrigation and infrastructural works, he transformed his  from a lion-infested swamp into an agriculturally-productive area. Umar recalled Sa'id to Syria and replaced him with Yahya ibn Yahya al-Ghassani.

Campaigns against the Byzantines
Under caliphs Yazid II and Hisham, Sa'id led a number of summer campaigns against the Byzantines in Anatolia. He commanded the left flank of the Umayyad army during the summer expedition of 724, but his forces incurred heavy losses. Yazid II was said to have considered Sa'id as a suitable chosen successor to the caliphate and may have encouraged Sa'id to entertain such notions. In 725, Sa'id again led the summer campaign against the Byzantines.

Governor of Palestine
During the relatively short caliphate of al-Walid II, Sa'id was appointed governor of Palestine. He was known to have governed the district well. According to al-Tabari, when al-Walid II was killed in 744, the Arab tribes of Palestine, led by Sa'id ibn Rawh, a chieftain of the Banu Judham and son of Rawh ibn Zinba, opted for their local Umayyad patron, Yazid ibn Sulayman ibn Abd al-Malik, to be their governor. To that end, they demanded that Sa'id, who was encamped in Beersheba or in the vicinity of Bayt Jibrin, vacate the governorship. Sa'id obliged and sought safety with al-Walid II's successor, Yazid III, in Damascus. The latter subsequently sent an expedition against the rebels in Palestine. Sa'id's governorship lasted fourteen months, between February 743 and April 744.

In excavations carried out by an Israeli archaeological team in Beit Shean in 1990, a broken bronze weight produced on the orders of Sa'id was unearthed. The weight was most likely produced in Ramla or Jerusalem. In addition to the Muslim statement of belief, the surviving portion of the rare weight bore an inscription in Kufic Arabic that read: "Ordered by the Amir Sa'id ibn Abd al-Malik at the hands of ...".

Death and descendants
Sa'id was killed alongside dozens of other Umayyads in a massacre by the Abbasids at the Abu Futrus river near Ramla in the wake of the Abbasids' toppling of the Umayyad state in 750.

Following the Abbasid takeover of Syria, Sa'id's grandsons, the brothers al-Asbagh ibn Muhammad, Hisham ibn Muhammad, and al-Walid ibn Muhammad, established themselves with other Umayyads in al-Andalus, where the Umayyad prince Abd al-Rahman I established the Emirate of Cordoba. Al-Asbagh married a sister of Abd al-Rahman I and their descendants held high-ranking positions as qadis (judges) and commanders. The family of Hisham was based in Seville. Al-Walid's family, the Banu A'isha, also held high ranks in the Emirate.

References

Bibliography

750 deaths
8th-century executions by the Abbasid Caliphate
Sons of Umayyad caliphs
Umayyad governors of Mosul
Umayyad people of the Arab–Byzantine wars
Umayyad governors of Palestine
8th-century Arabs